Loyalties may refer to:
 Loyalty, a philosophical concept
 Loyalty Islands
 Loyalties (play), a play by John Galsworthy
 Loyalties (1933 film), a 1933 film starring Basil Rathbone
 Loyalties (1986 film), a 1986 British/Canadian film (also known as Double allégeance)
 Loyalties (1999 film), a 1999 Canadian documentary about slavery
 Loyalties (novel), a 1985 novel by Raymond Williams